Yeclano Club de Fútbol was a Spanish football club based in Yecla, in the Region of Murcia. Founded in 1950 under the name of Club Deportivo Hispania de Yecla, it was dissolved in 2004.

After Yeclano's dissolution, another club in the city named Yeclano Deportivo was created.

Season to season
As CD Hispania de Yecla

As Yeclano CF

11 seasons in Segunda División B
18 seasons in Tercera División

External links
BDFutbol team profile
ArefePedia team profile 

Defunct football clubs in the Region of Murcia
Association football clubs established in 1950
Association football clubs disestablished in 2004
1950 establishments in Spain
2004 disestablishments in Spain